Glutathione peroxidase 5 (GPx-5), also known as epididymal secretory glutathione peroxidase is an enzyme that in humans is encoded by the GPX5 gene.

GPx-5 belongs to the glutathione peroxidase family. It is specifically expressed in the epididymis in the mammalian male reproductive tract, and is androgen-regulated. Unlike mRNAs for other characterized glutathione peroxidases, this mRNA does not contain a selenocysteine (UGA) codon. Thus, the encoded protein is selenium-independent, and has been proposed to play a role in protecting the membranes of spermatozoa from the damaging effects of lipid peroxidation and/or preventing premature acrosome reaction. Alternatively spliced transcript variants encoding different isoforms have been described for this gene.

References

Further reading

EC 1.11.1
Antioxidants